Joseph Frederick Hargrave (1880 – 19 October 1917), sometimes known as Fred Hargraves or Fred Hargreaves, was an English professional footballer who played as a centre forward for Burton United, Leeds City and Stoke.

Career
A centre forward, Hargrave began his career with his local non-league club Atherstone Town, before transferring to First Division club Aston Villa in July 1901, for whom he failed to make a senior appearance. After a spell with Midland League club Walsall, he transferred to Second Division club Burton United in July 1903. He top-scored for the club during the 1902–03 season and finished his three-year spell with 23 goals in 72 appearances. Hargrave transferred to fellow Second Division club Leeds City in July 1905 and had a prolific 1905–06 season in front of goal, scoring 19 goals in 34 appearances, which included seven goals in six FA Cup matches. He was moved to right half during the 1906–07 season and as a result, his goals dried up. Hargrave departed Leeds City in 1908 for Birmingham & District League club Stoke and scored 11 goals in 15 matches for the "Potters" during the 1908–09 season.

Personal life 
As of 1911, Hargrave was working as a hatter. In December 1915, during the second year of the First World War, he enlisted as a private in the Royal Garrison Artillery in Atherstone. While holding the rank of gunner, Hargrave was killed at Passchendaele on 19 October 1917 and was buried in Steenkerke Belgian Military Cemetery.

Career statistics

References

Military personnel from Warwickshire
Burials in Belgium
English footballers
Burton United F.C. players
Leeds City F.C. players
Stoke City F.C. players
English Football League players
1880 births
1917 deaths
Association football forwards
Association football wing halves
People from Atherstone
Atherstone Town F.C. players
Aston Villa F.C. players
Walsall F.C. players
British Army personnel of World War I
Royal Garrison Artillery soldiers
British military personnel killed in World War I